Mob rule or ochlocracy is the rule of government by a mob or mass of people and the intimidation of legitimate authorities. Insofar as it represents a pejorative for majoritarianism, it is akin to the Latin phrase mobile vulgus, meaning "the fickle crowd" from which the English term "mob" originally was derived in 1680s, during the Glorious Revolution.

Ochlocracy is synonymous in meaning and usage to the modern informal term "mobocracy", which arose in the 18th century as a colloquial neologism. Likewise, the ruling mobs in ochlocracies may sometimes genuinely reflect the will of the majority in a manner approximating democracy, but ochlocracy is characterised by the absence or impairment of a procedurally civil and democratic process.

An "ochlocrat" is one who is an advocate or partisan of ochlocracy. It also may be used as an adjective ("ochlocratic" or "ochlocratical").

Etymology 
Ochlocracy come from Greek okhlokratia with ὄχλος, óchlos (masses) + κράτος, krátos  (rule) literally meaning "rule by the masses".

Origin and theory 
Polybius appears to have coined the term ochlocracy in his 2nd century BC work Histories (6.4.6). He uses it to name the "pathological" version of popular rule, in opposition to the good version, which he refers to as democracy. There are numerous mentions of the word "ochlos" in the Talmud, in which "ochlos" refers to anything from "mob", "populace", to "armed guard", as well as in the writings of Rashi, a Jewish commentator on the Bible. The word was first recorded in English in 1584, derived from the French ochlocratie (1568), which stems from the original Greek okhlokratia, from okhlos ("mob") and kratos ("rule", "power", "strength").

Ancient Greek political thinkers regarded ochlocracy as one of the three "bad" forms of government (tyranny, oligarchy, and ochlocracy) as opposed to the three "good" forms of government: monarchy, aristocracy, and democracy. They distinguished "good" and "bad" according to whether the government form would act in the interest of the whole community ("good") or in the exclusive interests of a group or individual at the expense of justice ("bad").

The Polybian terminology for forms of state in ancient Greek philosophy has become customary. Polybius' predecessor, Aristotle, distinguished between different forms of democracy, stating that those disregarding the rule of law devolved into ochlocracy. The Polybian distinction between democracy and ochlocracy is absent in the works of Plato, who considered democracy to be a degraded form of government.

The threat of "mob rule" to a democracy is restrained by ensuring that the rule of law protects minorities or individuals against short-term demagoguery or moral panic. However, considering how laws in a democracy are established or repealed by the majority, the protection of minorities by rule of law is questionable. Some authors, like the Bosnian political theoretician Jasmin Hasanović, connect the emergence of ochlocracy in democratic societies with the decadence of democracy in neoliberalism in which "the democratic role of the people has been reduced mainly to the electoral process".

In history

During the late 17th and the early 18th centuries, English life was very disorderly. Although the Duke of Monmouth's rising of 1685 was the last rebellion, there was scarcely a year in which London or the provincial towns did not see aggrieved people breaking out into riots. In Queen Anne's reign (1702–14) the word "mob", first heard of not long before, came into general use. With no police force, there was little public order. Several decades later, the anti-Catholic Gordon Riots swept through London and claimed hundreds of lives; at the time, a proclamation painted on the wall of Newgate prison announced that the inmates had been freed by the authority of "His Majesty, King Mob".

The Salem Witch Trials in colonial Massachusetts during the 1690s, in which the unified belief of the townspeople overpowered the logic of the law, also has been cited by one essayist as an example of mob rule.

In 1837, Abraham Lincoln wrote about lynching and "the increasing disregard for law which pervades the country – the growing disposition to substitute the wild and furious passions in lieu of the sober judgment of courts, and the worse than savage mobs for the executive ministers of justice."

Mob violence played a prominent role in the early history of the Latter Day Saint movement. Examples include the expulsions from Missouri, the Haun's Mill massacre, the death of Joseph Smith, the expulsion from Nauvoo, the murder of Joseph Standing, and the Cane Creek Massacre. In an 1857 speech, Brigham Young gave an address demanding military action against "mobocrats."

See also

 Anacyclosis
 Anarchism
 Argumentum ad populum
 Bandwagon effect
 Cancel culture
 Collective consciousness
 Collective effervescence
 Collective intelligence
 Collectivism and individualism
 Communal violence
 Consensus reality
 Criticism of democracy
 Crowd manipulation
 Crowd psychology
 Diffusion of responsibility
 Direct democracy
 Group dynamics
 Herd behavior
 Illiberal democracy
 Lynching
 Mass psychogenic illness
 Mobbing
 Peer pressure
 Populism
 Presumption of guilt
 Political demonstration
 Smart mob
 Social group
 Spiral of silence
 Tyranny of the majority
 Vigilantism
 Vox populi

References
Notes

Bibliography
 Libby, Ronald T. (2021), American Ochlocracy: Black Lives Matter & Mob Rule. Miami: Twelve Tables Publisher 
 Campbell, Francis Stuart (pseudonym for Erik von Kuehnelt-Leddihn) (1943), The Menace of the Herd. Milwaukee: The Bruce Publishing Company 
 EtymologyOnLine

External links
 
 

Authoritarianism
Democracy
Pejorative terms for forms of government
Political systems
Crowd psychology